Callaway is a census designated place in St. Mary's County, Maryland, United States. Per the 2020 Census, the population was 1,779.

Demographics

2020 census

Note: the US Census treats Hispanic/Latino as an ethnic category. This table excludes Latinos from the racial categories and assigns them to a separate category. Hispanics/Latinos can be of any race.

References

Census-designated places in St. Mary's County, Maryland
Census-designated places in Maryland